William Burges (1827–1881) was an English architect, born in London.  He trained under Edward Blore and Matthew Digby Wyatt. As well as buildings, Burges was a noted designer of furniture. His Great Bookcase has been described as "the most important example of Victorian painted furniture ever made".

The list attempts to detail the most notable of Burges’s individual pieces of furniture, with their original locations, their dates of construction and their current locations where known. Some significant schemes of Burges furniture are, in essence, entire room fittings, such as the library at Cardiff Castle, and listings of these have not been attempted.

Pieces

Footnotes

References

References
 
 
 

Gothic Revival architecture
Burges

William Burges furniture